National Route 202 is a national highway of Japan connecting Hakata-ku, Fukuoka and Nagasaki, Nagasaki in Japan, with a total length of 199.6 km (124.03 mi).

References

National highways in Japan
Roads in Fukuoka Prefecture
Roads in Nagasaki Prefecture
Roads in Saga Prefecture